The Delta class, (Russian: Дельта) Soviet designations Project 667B Murena, Project 667BD Murena-M, Project 667BDR Kalmar, Project 667BDRM Delfin, (NATO reporting names Delta I, Delta II, Delta III, Delta IV respectively) are a series of nuclear-powered ballistic missile submarines, designed and built in the Soviet Union, which formed the backbone of the Soviet and Russian strategic submarine fleet since their introduction in 1973. They carry nuclear ballistic missiles of the R-29 Vysota family, with the Delta I, Delta II, Delta III and Delta IV classes carrying the R-29 (NATO reporting name: SS-N-8 'Sawfly'), R-29D (SS-N-8 'Sawfly'), R-29R (SS-N-18 'Stingray') and R-29RM (SS-N-23 'Skiff') respectively. The Delta I class carried 12 missiles, while the Delta II class which are lengthened versions of the Delta I class carry 16 missiles. The Delta III and Delta IV classes carry 16 missiles with multiple warheads and have improved electronics and noise reduction.  34 boats were built and commissioned during 1972–1990; approximately five or six remain active in 2023.

In turn the Deltas were superseded by the larger s. The early Deltas remained in service until the 1990s with treaties such as START I. High running costs and the retirement of the Typhoons R-39 missiles meant that some Delta III-class submarines were reactivated in the 2000s (decade) to replace the Typhoons.

In December 2010, Pavel Podvig at Russianforces.org estimated the strength of the Russian strategic submarine fleet at one Typhoon-class submarine (used to test the RSM-56 Bulava missile), four Delta III, six Delta IV class, and one  strategic missile submarines. They will ultimately be replaced by the new Borei class, also referred to as the Dolgorukiy class.

Development
In the 1960s the Soviet Navy wanted new submarine-launched nuclear missiles that could threaten targets in North America without their launch platforms needing to pass the SOSUS sensors in the GIUK gap to be within range.

Delta I (Project 667B Murena) 18 boats

The Delta-class submarines could deploy on alert patrols in the marginal ice-seas of the Soviet Arctic littoral, including the Norwegian and Barents Seas. Consequently, unlike their predecessors, they no longer needed to pass through Western SOSUS sonar barriers to come within range of their targets. To improve the accuracy of the missiles, the Delta I-class submarines carry the Tobol-B navigation system and the Cyclone-B satellite navigation system.

After authorization of the development of the class in 1965, the first Delta I, was commissioned into the Soviet Northern Fleet on 22 December 1972. A total of 18 submarines of this class were built, and all served Soviet Navy, under the designation Project 667B Murena ("Eel").

In 1991, nine Delta I-class submarines were still in active service. Their decommissioning began in 1994, with removal of the missile compartments scheduled by 1997. All submarines of this class were taken out of service by 1998 and were scrapped by 2005.

Delta II (Project 667BD Murena-M) 4 boats

The Delta II-class submarine was a large ballistic missile submarine designed to remedy shortcomings in the Delta I-class submarine. The new type of Delta also received additional quieting measures including having the steam turbines mounted on shock absorbers, having all pipes and hydraulics separated from the hull through rubber insulation, and a special hydroacoustic coating being applied to the hull.

The NATO reporting name, Delta II indicates this submarine as a visually distinguishable new class. The Soviet designation, 667BD Murena-M indicates this submarine is an improved Delta I.

Only four submarines of this class were built, apparently in favor of building the following class, the Delta III, and all Delta IIs were out of service by 1996.

Delta III (Project 667BDR Kalmar) 14 boats

The 667BDR Kal'mar ("Squid") Delta III-class submarine is a large ballistic missile submarine. Like the earlier Delta-class submarines the Delta III class is a double-hulled design with a thin, low magnetic steel outer hull wrapped around a thicker inner pressure hull. Development began in 1972 at the Rubin Central Design Bureau for Marine Engineering. The submarine was the first that could launch any number of missiles in a single salvo, as well as the first submarine capable of carrying ballistic missiles with multiple independently targetable reentry vehicles.

On 30 September 2008 a Russian Navy spokesman reported that Ryazan had successfully completed a 30-day transit from a base in northern Russia under the Arctic ice cap to a base on the Kamchatka Peninsula. The Navy added that Ryazan will soon be assigned to regularly patrol the Pacific Ocean. 

K-433 Svyatoy Georgiy Pobedonosets was involved in a collision with a fishing vessel on 22 September 2011. The submarine did not sustain serious damage.

Delta IV (Project 667BDRM Delfin) 7 boats

Seven Delta IV-class submarines were built; perhaps three or four remain in active service in the Russian Navy. The submarines, based at the Sayda Guba Naval Base, operate in the Northern Fleet. The Severodvinsk Shipyard built these vessels between 1981 and 1992.

The design of the Delta IV class resembles that of the Delta III class and constitutes a double-hulled configuration with missile silos housed in the inner hull.

On 29 December 2011, a shipyard fire broke out in the drydock where a Delta IV-class vessel named Ekaterinburg was being serviced. It was reported that the fire managed to spread to the submarine, that all weapons were disembarked from the submarine and the nuclear reactor was shut down beforehand.

Overall design
The submarines' design is similar to that of Delta III class (Project 667 BDR). The submarines constitutes a double-hulled configuration with missile silos housed in the inner hull. The forward horizontal hydroplanes are arranged on the sail. They can rotate to the vertical for breaking through the ice cover. The propulsion system provides a speed of  surfaced and  submerged. The submarines carry supplies for an endurance of 80 days. The surface of the submarines has an acoustic coating to reduce the acoustic signature.

See the Delta III class overview for specifications.

Armament
The Delta IV-class submarines employs the D-9RM launch system and carries 16 R-29RMU Sineva liquid-fueled missiles which each carry four independently targetable reentry vehicles (MIRVs). Unlike previous modifications, the Delta IV-class submarine is able to fire missiles in any direction from a constant course in a circular sector. All the missiles can be fired in a single salvo.

The battle management system Omnibus-BDRM controls all combat activities, processing data and commanding the torpedo and missile-torpedo weapons. The Shlyuz navigation system provides for the improved accuracy of the missiles and is capable of stellar navigation at periscope depths. The navigational system also employs two floating antenna buoys to receive radio-messages, target destination data and satellite navigation signals at great depth. The submarines are also equipped with the Skat-VDRM hydroacoustic system.

The Delta IV-class submarines are strategic nuclear missile submarines, designed to carry out strikes on military and industrial installations and naval bases. The submarines carry the RSM-5 Makeyev (NATO reporting name: SS-N-23 Skiff) submarine-launched ballistic missile (SLBM). The CEP value is a measure of the accuracy of strike on the target and is the radius of the circle within which half the strikes will impact.

The submarines are also capable of launching the Novator SS-N-15 Starfish anti-ship missile or anti-ship torpedoes. The submarines have four 533 mm torpedo tubes capable of launching all types of torpedoes, including anti-submarine torpedoes and anti-hydroacoustic devices. The system is fitted with a rapid reloading torpedo system. The submarines can carry up to 12 missiles or torpedoes. All torpedoes are accommodated in the bow section of the hull.

In 2011 K-84 Ekaterinburg successfully tested a new version of the SS-N-23 missile, reportedly designated R-29RMU2 Layner. The missile has improved survivability against anti-ballistic missiles. Later on K-114 Tula conducted another successful launch.

Deployment
Initially all the Delta IV-class submarines were based with the Russian Northern Fleet at Olenya Bay. All the submarines of this class serve in 12th Squadron (the former 3rd flotilla) of strategic submarines of the Northern Fleet, which now located in Yagelnaya Bay.

Units

See also
 List of Soviet and Russian submarine classes
 Future of the Russian Navy
 Submarine-launched ballistic missile

References

External links

667B Murena/Delta I at GlobalSecurity.org
667BDR Delta III at GlobalSecurity.org
Type 667 "Delta" class at Aeronautics.ru
SSBN Delta Class IV (Project 667.BDRM) at Naval-technology.com
Project 667.BDR Kalmar Strategic Missile Undersea Cruiser (Delta-3 class, 14 subs) at Armscontrol.ru
Federation of American Scientists
Haze Gray & Underway: World Navies Today: Russia

Submarine classes
 
 
 
Russian and Soviet navy submarine classes
Soviet inventions
Nuclear-powered submarines